George Norman (23 August 1890 – 24 November 1964) was an English cricketer.  His batting hand and bowling style are unknown.

Norman made 4 first-class appearances for Essex in the 1920 County Championship, making his debut for the county against Gloucestershire. Norman represented Essex in 3 further first-class matches during the 1920 season, with his final first-class match coming against Somerset.

In his 4 first-class matches, he scored 44 runs at a batting average of 11.00, with a high score of 21.  In the field he took a single catch.

References

External links
George Norman at Cricinfo
George Norman at CricketArchive

1890 births
1964 deaths
People from Westminster
Cricketers from Greater London
English cricketers
Essex cricketers